The Battle of Monck's Corner was fought on April 14, 1780, outside the city of Charleston, South Carolina, which was under siege by British forces under the command of General Sir Henry Clinton in the American Revolutionary War.  The Loyalist British Legion, under the command of Lieutenant Colonel Banastre Tarleton, surprised an American force stationed at Monck's Corner, and drove them away.  The action cut off an avenue of escape for Benjamin Lincoln's besieged army.  Aside from the British Legion, and the 33rd Foot and 64th Foot led by Lt. Col. James Webster, the force included Loyalists, the American Volunteers, led by Maj. Patrick Ferguson.

Background
The majority of the British soldiers who took part in the Battle of Monck's Corner were Loyalist troops raised from the colony of South Carolina, although a detachment of the 17th Light Dragoons under Capt. William Henry Talbotwith also participated. Tarleton's unit was known as the Loyalist British Legion, under the command of Lieutenant Colonel Banastre Tarleton.  General Sir Henry Clinton arrived before Charleston, South Carolina on 1st April 1780, and began siege preparations as the opening move in British plan to gain control over North and South Carolina.  The city was defended by Continental Army troops under the command of General Benjamin Lincoln.  Even after the British operations were underway, troops continued to arrive in the city to assist in its defense.  On April 8, after the British had begun establishing siege lines around part of the city, 750 Virginia Continentals, under the command of William Woodford, arrived in the city.  

Clinton learned that a supply train, which was actually the baggage train of this company, was nearing the city, and decided to cut the supply route.

In order to protect their own lines, the British needed to face General Isaac Huger and his detachment that Lincoln had stationed at Monck's Corner.  Huger's force consisted of 500 men, including cavalry under the command of Lt. Col. William Washington, and elements of Pulaski's Legion under the command of Chevalier Pierre-Francois Vernier.

On the evening of 13 April, Tarleton intercepted a letter from Huger meant for Lincoln, and learned the disposition of Huger's force.  His march continued on in silence.

Battle
The British attacked at 3 AM on the morning of April 14.  What followed quickly became a rout.
According to Tarleton, "The Americans were completely surprised, General Huger, Colonels Washington and Jamieson, with many officers and men, fled on foot to the swamps.."  

American casualties included 14 killed, 19 wounded and 64 captured.  The biggest prize was the capture of the horses belonging to the American officers and cavalry.

Aftermath
Tarleton's reputation for swift surprise attacks started with this first major victory of his in the South. Following the battle, some of Tarleton's Legion dragoons went on a rampage as documented by Charles Stedman, including the killing of the Pulaski Horse commander Vernier after he had asked for quarter, and "attempts to ravish several ladies" at the Colleton plantation. Maj. Patrick Ferguson was offended by these acts, and Webster had the perpetrators sent back to the main army camp outside Charleston, where they were "tried and whipped." Some of the scattered remnants of Huger's force made their way north and east. They eventually regrouped under Colonel Anthony Walton White, but were again scattered by Tarleton at Lenud's Ferry on May 6. Lincoln was forced to surrender Charleston and more than 5,000 Continental Army troops on May 12.  It was the worst American loss of the war.  The United States Army did not suffer a loss of similar size until the Battle of Harper's Ferry during the American Civil War.

References

Sources
Ward, Christopher. The War of the Revolution. 1952.
Wilson, David. The Southern Strategy. University of South Carolina Press. 2005.

Conflicts in 1780
Battles involving the United States
Battles involving Great Britain
Monck's Corner
Berkeley County, South Carolina
Monck's Corner
1780 in South Carolina